Children's Liver Disease Foundation (CLDF) is a UK charity taking action against the effects of childhood liver disease, providing information, emotional support, research funds and a voice for all affected.

CLDF was founded in 1980 by the parents of a little boy named Michael McGough, who died before be could receive a liver transplant.  The name was later changed to Children's Liver Disease Foundation.

Today the charity works in four main areas, support of families and young people affected by childhood liver disease, funding medical and social research into all aspects of childhood liver disease and education, providing educational services to the general public and the medical profession and providing a voice for all affected by childhood liver disease. The charity works closely with the three UK specialist paediatric liver centres: Birmingham Children's Hospital, King's College Hospital, London and Leeds General Infirmary.

CLDF provides support to families and young people affected by childhood liver disease, including an ‘on-call’ telephone and email service and face to face meetings with parents and young people at hospitals and clinics.

The charity has also developed a range of literature for families, young people and healthcare professionals.  CLDF's literature series includes a medical series, with leaflets on the main liver diseases affecting children (biliary atresia, alpha 1-antitrypsin deficiency, autoimmune hepatitis, hepatitis A, hepatitis B, hepatitis C, Wilson's disease etc.)  CLDF has also produced a nutrition series,  a  support series for families and information written especially for children and young people.  CLDF also provides the paediatric liver transplant units with a series of leaflets on transplantation to accompany the paediatric liver transplant programme.



Yellow Alert campaign
CLDF's prolonged jaundice awareness campaign, Yellow Alert aims to promote the early identification and appropriate referral of babies with prolonged jaundice – a sign of possible liver disease.

References

External links
 Children's Liver Disease Foundation website

Diseases of liver
Foundations based in England
Foundations based in the United Kingdom
Medical and health foundations
Organizations established in 1980
Organizations for children with health issues
Charities based in Birmingham, West Midlands
Charities based in the West Midlands (county)